Man from Plains (originally titled He Comes in Peace) is a 2007 American documentary film written and directed by Jonathan Demme, which chronicles former President of the United States Jimmy Carter's book tour across America to publicize his book Palestine: Peace Not Apartheid.
For the book promotion, Carter grants interviews to selected newspapers, magazines, and television shows, such as CNN, PBS, Air America Radio, NPR, Chicago Life, Los Angeles Times, and The Tonight Show with Jay Leno.

Festival screenings
Man from Plains debuted at the Toronto International Film Festival on September 10, 2007. The film won 3 awards at the 2007 Venice Film Festival: FIPRESCI Prize, EIUC Award and Biografilm Award.

Box office
The film grossed $108,807.

Notes

External links
 Man From Plains Participant Media
 An intimate, surprising encounter with President Jimmy Carter Take Part
 

2007 films
American documentary films
Documentary films about American politicians
Sony Pictures Classics films
Cultural depictions of Jimmy Carter
Documentary films about writers
Films directed by Jonathan Demme
Participant (company) films
2000s English-language films
2000s American films